To ostatnia niedziela (1935) is one of the long-time hits of Jerzy Petersburski. A nostalgic tango with lyrics by Zenon Friedwald describing the final meeting of former lovers just before they break up, it was performed by numerous artists and gained the nickname of Suicide Tango, due to its brooding lyrical content.

Other versions
After the war the song remained largely successful and was one of the symbols of pre-war music in Polish popular culture. Performed by, among others, Mieczysław Fogg and Piotr Fronczewski, it appeared in a number of films, including:

 Andrei Mikhalkov-Konchalovsky's Siberiade (1979),
 Yuri Norstein's acclaimed Tale of Tales of the same year,
 The Parrot Speaking Yiddish (1990) directed by Efraim Sevela,
 Schindler's List (1993),
 Krzysztof Kieślowski's award-winning Three Colors: White (1994),
 Nikita Mikhalkov's Burnt by the Sun (1994)

The Russian title of the song also became the namesake for the latter film. There exist a famous contemporary recording of the violinist Gidon Kremer.

Also the Ukrainian version written by  exists.

A pop-rock version was used for the trailer of Atomic Heart.

Lyrics (Polish)

Lyrics (Russian)

References

Polish songs
Polish-language songs
1935 songs
Russian songs
Tangos
Tango in Poland